Araneta Center–Cubao station (also called as Araneta–Cubao station or simply Cubao station) is an elevated Manila Light Rail Transit (LRT) station situated on Line 2. The station is located in Cubao in Quezon City and is named after the old name of Araneta City, a mixed-use development.

The station is the eighth station for trains headed to Antipolo and the sixth station for trains headed to Recto.

Araneta Center–Cubao station also serves as a terminus of the line. The station layout is composed of three platforms: The two main platforms serve the entire system (Eastbound and Westbound) and an extra platform serves as a terminus. The extra platform, currently unused, is found under the main platforms where the concourse area can also be found.

It first commenced operations on April 5, 2003.

Nearby establishments
The most recognizable landmark that the station is located at is the Araneta City, which hosts shopping malls such a Ali Mall, Farmers Plaza and Gateway Mall, where the station's south entrance is located, as well as the Smart Araneta Coliseum. Also located on the opposite side of the Araneta Center Complex is the Diamond Arcade which is a smaller mall across Gateway Mall.

The station is also adjacent to Project 5 or Barangay E. Rodriguez, the location of other shopping establishments such as DiviMart, Hansel Arcade and Diamond Arcade, as well as Cubao Elementary School.

Transportation links
Due to its location at Araneta City, the station is located in a major transportation hub. Provincial buses stop at the Araneta Center Bus Port within the complex, and jeepneys for various destinations all over Metro Manila and Rizal province, UV Express, taxis and tricycles are available upon request. Traffic regulations, however, prohibit tricycles on EDSA and Aurora Boulevard.

The station is also the transit point for commuters riding the Manila Metro Rail Transit System Line 3. It is connected to its namesake station via a walkway that goes through the Gateway Mall, past the Smart Araneta Coliseum and through New Farmers Plaza to the station's entrance just outside New Farmers Plaza.

References

Manila Light Rail Transit System stations
Railway stations opened in 2003
Buildings and structures in Quezon City